Charles Digby M.A. (31 May 1775 - 26 May 1841) was a Canon of Windsor from 1808 to 1841

Family

He was born on 31 May 1775, the son of Colonel Hon. Stephen Digby and Lady Lucy Fox-Strangways.

On 8 June 1801 he married Mary Somerville, daughter of Lt.-Col. Hon. Hugh Somerville and Mary Digby. They had the following children:
Charles Wriothesly Digby (2 May 1802 - 29 December 1873)
Captain George Somerville Digby (27 September 1805 - 16 November 1864)

Career

He was educated at St Mary Hall, Oxford where he graduated BA in 1798 and MA in 1801.

He was appointed:
Rector of Middle Chinnock, Somerset 1807
Rector of Chisleborough with West Chinnock 1807
Rector of Bishops Caundle, Dorset 1810

He was appointed to the second stall in St George's Chapel, Windsor Castle in 1808, and held the stall until 1841.

Notes 

1775 births
1841 deaths
Canons of Windsor
Alumni of St Mary Hall, Oxford